The 2d Fighter Squadron (Commando) is an inactive United States Air Force unit.  It was last assigned to the Tenth Air Force, based at Camp Kilmer, New Jersey.   It was inactivated on 12 November 1945.

History

Lineage
 Constituted 2d Fighter Reconnaissance Squadron on 11 April 1944
 Activated on 20 April 1944
 Redesignated as: 2d Fighter Squadron (Commando) on 2 June 1944
 Inactivated on 12 November 1945
 Disbanded on 8 October 1948.

Assignments
 Third Air Force, 20 April 1944
 2d Air Commando Group, 22 April 1944-12 November 1945.
 Army Service Forces, 11–12 November 1945

Stations
 Lakeland AAF, Florida, 20 April 1944
 Cross City AAF, Florida, 12 June 1944
 Alachua AAF, Florida, 21 June 1944
 Drew Field, Florida, 17 August 1944
 Lakeland AAF, Florida, 22 August-23 October 1944
 Kalaikunda Airfield, India, 14 December 1944
 Cox's Bazar, India, 13 February 1945
 Kalaikunda Airfield, India, io May-22 October 1945
 Camp Kilmer, New Jersey, 11–12 November 1945.

Aircraft
 P-51D Mustang, 1944–1945
 F-6 (P-51D) Mustang, 1945

Operational history
Trained for operations with P-51 Mustangs as part of Third Air Force and trained at the Army Air Force School of Applied Tactics.   Moved to India, September–November 1944 assigned to Tenth Air Force. Combat in CBI, 14 February-9 May 1945.  After May 1945 in training. Returned to the US during October— November 1945.

References

External links

001